Zlatanović is a Serbian surname. Notable people with the surname include:

Arsenije Zlatanović (born 1989), Serbian tennis player
Igor Zlatanović (born 1998), Serbian footballer

Serbian surnames
Slavic-language surnames
Patronymic surnames